Delmont T. Moffitt (December 21, 1911 – June 30, 2001) was an American politician from the state of Iowa.

Moffitt was born in Woodstock, Pipestone County, Minnesota in 1911. He served as a Republican in the Iowa House of Representatives from 1961 to 1965, 1967 to 1969, and 1971 to 1973. Moffitt died in Centerville, Appanoose County, Iowa in 2001, and was interred in Concord Cemetery in Appanoose County, Iowa.

References

|-

|-

1911 births
2001 deaths
People from Appanoose County, Iowa
People from Pipestone County, Minnesota
Republican Party members of the Iowa House of Representatives
20th-century American politicians